Helyer is a surname. Notable people with the surname include:

William Allen alias Helyer, MP for Westbury (UK Parliament constituency)
Richard Helyer (died 1446), English Archdeacon

See also
Heller (surname)
Helyar